Jean-Louis Rodrigue (born May 23, 1951 Casablanca, Morocco,) is an acting coach, movement director, and senior teacher of the Alexander Technique. He has worked in Los Angeles and New York in theatre, film, television, and digital media. 

Rodrigue has taught at the Berlin International Film Festival, Generation Campus in Moscow, Verbier Festival in Switzerland, Universidad de la Comunicación (México) in Mexico City, Berlinale Talents in Guadalajara, USC Thornton School of Music, Manhattan School of Music, National Institute of Dramatic Art in Sydney, and Digital Life Design Women in Munich. Rodrigue has been a faculty member at the UCLA School of Theater, Film and Television and the UCLA Herb Alpert School of Music for the past 34 years.

Early life and education 

Jean-Louis Rodrigue was born on May 23, 1951 in Casablanca, Morocco and was raised in Milan, Italy.

At eight years old, he decided to become an actor after viewing Ferruccio Soleri in “Arlecchino, Servant of Two Masters” at Piccolo Teatro di Milano. In 1967, he began working with Herbert Berghof at the HB Studio and Sonia Moore at the American Center for Stanislavski Theater Art in New York.

In 1970, William Ball awarded Rodrigue a full scholarship to study in the Advanced Training Program at the American Conservatory Theater (ACT) in San Francisco. During Rodrigue's training at ACT, he discovered the Alexander Technique.  He then stayed three more years to train at the American Center for the Alexander Technique, San Francisco.

In post-formal training, Rodrigue studied with Alexander Technique teachers Marjorie Barstow, Walter Carrington, Patrick McDonald, and Dilys Carrington. Rodrigue is also a certified teacher of Jessica Wolf’s The Art of Breathing.

Teaching career 

In 1980, Rodrigue founded Alexander Techworks.  The company provides private instruction, training, coaching, group classes, and workshops in Los Angeles, New York, and other cities. He and Kristof Konrad own and operate the business together. 

From 1998 to 2005, Rodrigue was part of the faculty of Verbier Festival. 

Rodrigue teaches workshops at Larry Moss' Studio. He has taught masterclasses at the Howard Fine Acting Studios in Los Angeles and Australia. He founded the Alexander Technique program at the Los Angeles Philharmonic, where he taught for six years. He has worked with circus artists of Cirque du Soleil’s Ka at the MGM Grand in Las Vegas.

He had reportedly been hired in by the FBI to teach stress management and respiratory control for agents infiltrating Middle Eastern terrorist cells.

Film and television 
Rodrigue has coached actors in films including: I, Tonya, Vice, Mary Queen of Scots, Love and Mercy (film), J. Edgar, W., Passion Fish, The Time Machine, Seabiscuit (film), and The Normal Heart (film). He collaborated with director Ang Lee and screenwriter David Magee in the development of the tiger movement for the film Life of Pi.  Rodrigue choreographed the period movement for the film The Affair of the Necklace. 

Since 2009, Rodrigue has conducted several workshops at the Berlinale Talent Campus program. He was involved in the development of a new hands-on training programs for emerging actors, the Talent Actors Stage, for which 15-20 international actors are selected annually.

Theatre 
Rodrigue has coached at several Los Angeles locations throughout his career. At the Geffen Playhouse, Rodrigue was the movement coach on Nine Parts of Desire in 2005 and on Long Day's Journey into Night in 2017. He was awarded a fellowship grant from the Montalvo Arts Center to develop and direct a play adaptation of the novel, The Reader. He coached Chris Pine in The Lieutenant of Inishmore at the Mark Taper Forum. He also worked with Gulu Monteiro on The Bacchae at the Getty Villa.

Rodrigue has collaborated with Larry Moss on Daisy White’s Sugar, The Syringa Tree at Playhouse 91 in New York and Bo Eason’s Runt of the Litter at the 37 Arts Theater, N.Y. He has coached with Rita Maffei and Larry Moss in an Italian production of The Syringa Tree at the Teatro Stabile di Innovazione in Udine and at Il Piccolo Teatro di Milano, Italy.

Animal Studies 
Rodrigue integrates animal behavior and movement into his research and work. He is known for helping actors develop characters through animal movement studies. His primary areas of research are animal movement, behavior, morphology, nature perception, and human/animal connections. This interest was sparked by Leonardo da Vinci and Carlo Mazzone-Clementi. 

While in Milano in 1957, Rodrigue's father introduced him to the scientific and artistic work of DaVinci. They would often go to the National Museum of Science and Technology to view the models of DaVinci’s inventions . They also would visit the Veneranda Biblioteca Ambrosiana, the largest archive of Da Vinci’s drawings of animals.

Later in his life while studying at the American Conservatory Theater in San Francisco, Jean-Louis studied with Mazzone-Clementi who introduced him to the application of animal behavior and movement to character development.

Select awards and recognition 
Rodrigue was awarded a fellowship grant in 2008 from the Montalvo Arts Center to develop and direct a play adaptation of Bernhard Schlink’s novel, The Reader.

Credits

Filmography

Theater

References

External links 
 

1951 births
Living people
American directors